The 2008 Conference USA Football Championship Game was played on December 6, 2008 at Chapman Stadium in Tulsa, Oklahoma to determine the 2008 football champion of the Conference USA (C-USA). The game featured the East Carolina Pirates, the East Division champions, and the Tulsa Golden Hurricane, the West Division champions. The game kicked off at 12:00 pm EST and was televised by ESPN2.

Scoring summary

References

Championship
Conference USA Football Championship Game
East Carolina Pirates football games
Tulsa Golden Hurricane football games
Conference USA Football Championship Game
Conference USA football